Unto Us is the sixth studio album by Aaron Shust. Centricity Music released the project on October 14, 2014. Aaron Shust worked with producers James Fitzpatrick and David Hamilton in the creation of this album.

Reception

Specifying in a four star review by CCM Magazine, Grace S. Aspinwall realizes, "Although this is a Christmas album, the signature sound of worship leader Aaron Shust peeks through the cinematic feel and beautiful tapestry of the record... The intricate strings and lovely movement of the record will secure it as a favorite for years to come." Adding a half star to his rating compared to the aforementioned, Jesus Freak Hideout's Christopher Smith responds, "Aaron Shust has pulled off something spectacular with Unto Us." Jonathan Francesco, indicating in a four and a half star review for New Release Tuesday, recognizes, "Aaron Shust has created a modern Christmas classic that flirts heavily with terms like 'masterpiece.'"

Track listing

References

2014 albums
Aaron Shust albums
Centricity Music albums